Adeniran is a given name and surname of Yoruba origin. Notable people with this name include:
 Adeniran Ogunsanya (1918–1996), Nigerian lawyer and politician
 Daniel Ajayi-Adeniran, Pentecostal pastor from Nigeria
 Dennis Adeniran (born 1999), English professional footballer
 Mo Adeniran (born 1995), English singer
 Sade Adeniran, Nigerian novelist
 Samuel Adeniran (born 1998), American professional footballer
 Tunde Adeniran (born 1945), Nigerian scholar, politician and diplomat

See also 
 Adeniran Ogunsanya (1918–1996), Nigerian lawyer and politician
 

 Surnames of Nigerian origin
Yoruba-language surnames
Yoruba given names